Kaya is a common last name in Turkic countries and means rock in Turkish.

Ahmet Kaya (1957-2000), Kurdish singer from turkey
Ali Kaya (athlete) (born Stanley Kiprotich Mukche in 1994), Kenyan-Turkish long-distance runner
Ali Kaya (serial killer) (born 1979), Turkish serial killer
Aykut Kaya (born 1990), Turkish karateka
Belkıs Zehra Kaya (born 1984), Turkish female judoka
Cansu Nur Kaya (born 2000), Turkish women's footballer
Enes Kaya (born 1984), Turkish television personality
Fatma Koşer Kaya (born 1968), Dutch female politician of Turkish descent
Fırat Kaya (born 1995), Germany-born Turkish deaf footballer
Hazal Kaya (born 1990), Turkish actress
İpek Kaya (born 1994), Turkish-French women's footballer
Kıvılcım Kaya (born 1992), Turkish female hammer thrower
Markus Kaya (born 1979), German footballer
Mihriban Kaya (born 1996), Turkish female Paralympian track and field athlete
Nihan Kaya (born 1979), Turkish female writer
Onur Kaya (born 1986), Belgian footballer of Turkish descent
Özlem Kaya (athlete) (born 1990), Turkish female middle distance runner
Özlem Kaya (swimmer) (born 1992), Turkish female Para swimmer
Semih Kaya (born 1991), Turkish footballer
Serkan Kaya (born 1984), Turkish marathon runner
Şükrü Kaya (1883-1959), Turkish politician
Zübeyde Kaya (born 1991), Turkish women's footballer

Kaya is also a Japanese surname. Notable people with the surname include:

, Minister of Finance of Japan 
, Japanese artistic gymnast
, a member of the Japanese imperial family
, a member of the Japanese imperial family

See also

Kaja (name)
Kaya (given name)
Kaya (disambiguation)

Turkish-language surnames
Japanese-language surnames
Surnames from nicknames